Homeboys is the third album by alternative rock band Adam Again.

Track listing
All lyrics by Gene Eugene except where noted. Music by Gene Eugene and Adam Again except where noted.

"Homeboys" – 3:41
"The Fine Line" – 4:32
"Hide Away" (Lyrics: Steve Hindalong) – 2:51
"Bad News on the Radio" – 3:52
"Inner City Blues (Make Me Wanna Holler)" (Marvin Gaye, James Nyx) – 5:44
"Dance Around in Circles" – 2:38
"This Band Is Our House" – 5:56
"Save Me" (Lyrics: Riki Michele) – 4:11
"Occam's Razor" (Lyrics: Terry Scott Taylor) – 3:34
"No Regrets" – 5:24

Personnel 
Adam Again
 Riki Michele – vocals 
 Gene Eugene – vocals, Rhodes piano, Hammond B3 organ, guitars
 Greg Lawless – lead guitars
 Paul Valadez – bass, lead guitar intro (8)
 John Knox – drums 

with:
 James Werning – keyboards 
 Dan Michaels – saxophone 
 John Harrelson – fiddle (1), mandolin (3)
 Miles Tackett – cello (3, 9), acoustic guitar (5)
 Doug Webb – saxophone (4)
 Howard Finster – preaching

Production
 Gene Eugene – producer, recording, mixing
 Greg Lawless – additional engineer, mixing (1, 2, 5-10)
 C. Anderson – additional engineer
 Joey "Ojo" Taylor – additional engineer
 Paul Valadez – additional engineer, mixing (1, 2, 5-10)
 Jeff Simmons – mixing (3, 4)
 Dave Collins – assembling at A&M Studios (Hollywood, California)
 Mastered at Bernie Grundman Mastering (Hollywood, California)
 Bruce Heavin – art direction, layout, photography

References

1990 albums
Adam Again albums
Broken Records (record label) albums